Altamont is a city in Labette County, Kansas, United States.  As of the 2020 census, the population of the city was 1,061.

History
Altamont had its start in the year 1879 by the building of the railroad through that territory. The first settlers of Altamont was the Huston family. The present day street is named after them. When they went to the nearby town of Oswego, people would ask them where they lived. They would say about a mile east of the lone tree. Since there weren't many trees in Kansas at the time this would be served as a landmark. It was named after Altamont, Illinois. Altamont was incorporated in 1884.

Geography
Altamont is located at  (37.189803, -95.293529).

Climate
The climate in this area is characterized by hot, humid summers and generally mild to cool winters.  According to the Köppen Climate Classification system, Altamont has a humid subtropical climate, abbreviated "Cfa" on climate maps.

Demographics

2010 census
As of the census of 2010, there were 1,080 people, 419 households, and 291 families residing in the city. The racial makeup of the city was 92.7% White, 0.6% African American, 1.9% Native American, 0.5% from other races, and 4.3% from two or more races. Hispanic or Latino of any race were 2.5% of the population.

There were 419 households, of which 39.1% had children under the age of 18 living with them, 52.5% were married couples living together, 11.9% had a female householder with no husband present, 5.0% had a male householder with no wife present, and 30.5% were non-families. 27.4% of all households were made up of individuals, and 14.1% had someone living alone who was 65 years of age or older. The average household size was 2.58 and the average family size was 3.12.

The median age in the city was 36.1 years. 29.3% of residents were under the age of 18; 8.5% were between the ages of 18 and 24; 26.2% were from 25 to 44; 22% were from 45 to 64; and 14.1% were 65 years of age or older. The gender makeup of the city was 46.7% male and 53.3% female.

2000 census
As of the census of 2000, there were 1,092 people, 427 households, and 303 families residing in the city. The racial makeup of the city was 96.43% White, 1.37% Native American, 0.18% Asian, 0.09% from other races, and 1.92% from two or more races. Hispanic or Latino of any race were 0.55% of the population.

There were 427 households, out of which 35.8% had children under the age of 18 living with them, 60.0% were married couples living together, 8.2% had a female householder with no husband present, and 29.0% were non-families. 26.5% of all households were made up of individuals, and 14.8% had someone living alone who was 65 years of age or older. The average household size was 2.51 and the average family size was 3.05.

In the city, the population was spread out, with 29.0% under the age of 18, 6.3% from 18 to 24, 25.5% from 25 to 44, 20.7% from 45 to 64, and 18.5% who were 65 years of age or older. The median age was 36 years. For every 100 females, there were 87.0 males. For every 100 females age 18 and over, there were 82.8 males.

The median income for a household in the city was $32,431, and the median income for a family was $40,987. Males had a median income of $30,694 versus $22,019 for females. The per capita income for the city was $14,895. About 5.2% of families and 9.5% of the population were below the poverty line, including 8.2% of those under age 18 and 21.2% of those age 65 or over.

Education
The community is served by Labette County USD 506 public school district. The district school office, Labette County High School, and Altamont Grade School are located in the city of Altamont, and four grade schools are located in other cities in the school district.

The Labette County High School mascot is the Grizzlies, and their colors are red and gold.  Previously, Altamont High School was closed when school unification merged into .

Altamont Grade School, a Pre-K through 8th grade facility, acts as a feeder school to Labette County High School. Altamont Grade School's mascot is the Eagles, and their colors are Navy and Columbia Blue.

References

Further reading

External links
 City of Altamont
 Altamont - Directory of Public Officials
 Altamont city map, KDOT

Cities in Kansas
Cities in Labette County, Kansas
1879 establishments in Kansas
Populated places established in 1879